Tuzdy is a salt lake cluster in Akzhaik District, West Kazakhstan Region, Kazakhstan.

Geography
It is part of the Ural River basin. The lake group is fed by snow, as well as groundwater. The individual lakes have very indented shores and may become a single lake during heavy spring floods. In the summer the lakes are mostly dry. 

River Olenti flows from the north but doesn't reach the lake group. The Zhylandy, a short river, begins a little to the southeast from where the Olenti disperses in the sand. It flows southwards and reaches the northern tip of the Tuzdy. To the south and southeast stretches the wide lake area that lies at the end of river Kaldygaity, near Tolen village.

See also
List of lakes of Kazakhstan
Sor (geomorphology)

References

External links

Tourism and recreational potential of the salt lakes of Western Kazakhstan

Lake groups of Kazakhstan
West Kazakhstan Region
Ural basin
Caspian Depression